Jaguar Love was an American post-punk band formed in Portland, Oregon in 2007. It was composed of former members of The Blood Brothers.

History
The band was formed by members of the bands Blood Brothers and Pretty Girls Make Graves. On January 21, 2008, the band announced via MySpace that they had signed to Matador Records, former home of Pretty Girls Make Graves.

Their debut album "Take Me to the Sea" was released digitally on August 18, 2008, on Matador Records. The album leaked onto the internet on July 15, 2008.

Johnny Whitney's vocals have been described as "like Robert Plant on steroids, or Perry Farrell after a sex change".

They toured Europe in summer 2008, including appearances at major festivals such as T in the Park, which was followed by an American tour, opening for Polysics, before again touring internationally later in the year.

They announced via MySpace on February 18, 2009, on a bulletin that they would be making changes to their line-up as well as their sound.

The band signed to Fat Possum Records. On November 3, 2009, the band posted a song entitled "Up All Night". The song was heard frequently during their tour in the summer of 2009. The band released their second album "Hologram Jams" on March 2, 2010.

Influences and Musical Style
Johnny and Cody's state in their infamous Blood Brothers outfit still took advantage of the screaming, which captivates Johnny's 'jaguar' like sounding screams. Their genre differs from their last outfit, taking more of an indie rock approach. As well as baroque pop, art rock, soul, hip-hop, experimental and post-punk.

Jaguar Love is influenced by Gang of Four, Jay-Z, New Order, Bootsy Collins, Weezer, Botch, Antioch Arrow and The Smiths.

In their latest material, they turn to a more new wave/dance-punk style, keeping the vocal and guitar statements true.

Discography
 Highways of Gold 7" Single - June 3, 2008
 Jaguar Love EP - June 3, 2008
 Take Me to the Sea - August 19, 2008
 Hologram Jams - March 2, 2010

Members
 Cody Votolato – guitar, bass guitar
 Johnny Whitney – vocals, piano

Former members
 J. Clark – drums, bass guitar, keyboard

Support members
 Craig Bonich – bass guitar
 Zach Richards - drums

References

External links

Interview with Cody Votolato on Jekyll and Hyde, 106FM Jerusalem

Fat Possum Records artists
Musical groups from Seattle